The Eparchy of Sohag is an eparchy of the Coptic Catholic Church, centered in the ecclesiastical province of the Coptic Catholic Patriarch of Alexandria.

The Eparchy was erected on 13 September 1981.

Hierarches
 Bishop Morkos Hakim, O.F.M. (26 May 1982 – 9 August 2003)
 Bishop Youssef Aboul-Kheir (9 August 2003 - 14 June 2019)
 Bishop Basilios Fawzy Al-Dabe (since 14 June 2019)

External links
Catholic-Hierarchy.org information on the eparchy

Christianity in Alexandria
Sohag
Eastern Catholicism in Egypt
Religious organizations established in the 1980s